The 1997–98 Sri Lankan cricket season featured two Test series with Sri Lanka playing against Zimbabwe and New Zealand.

Honours
 P Saravanamuttu Trophy – Sinhalese Sports Club
 Hatna Trophy – Nondescripts Cricket Club
 Most runs – MS Atapattu 868 @ 96.44 (HS 223)
 Most wickets – UC Hathurusingha 35 @ 16.17 (BB 7-55)

Test series
Sri Lanka won the Test series against Zimbabwe 2–0:
 1st Test @ Asgiriya Stadium, Kandy – Sri Lanka won by 8 wickets
 2nd Test @ Sinhalese Sports Club Ground, Colombo – Sri Lanka won by 5 wickets

Sri Lanka won the Test series against New Zealand 2–1:
 1st Test @ R Premadasa Stadium, Colombo – New Zealand won by 167 runs
 2nd Test @ Galle International Stadium – Sri Lanka won by an innings and 16 runs
 3rd Test @ Sinhalese Sports Club Ground, Colombo – Sri Lanka won by 164 runs

External sources
  CricInfo – brief history of Sri Lankan cricket
 CricketArchive – Tournaments in Sri Lanka

Further reading
 Wisden Cricketers' Almanack 1999

Sri Lankan cricket seasons from 1972–73 to 1999–2000